The Odyssey is the sixth studio album by progressive metal band Symphony X, released on November 5, 2002 through Inside Out Music. The album is the band's first to be recorded entirely at guitarist Michael Romeo's home studio, The Dungeon. "Accolade II" is a sequel to "The Accolade" from The Divine Wings of Tragedy (1996). The title track is the album's grand finale: a 24-minute musical interpretation of Homer's Odyssey, an epic poem about the journey of ancient Greek hero Odysseus.

Critical reception

Alex Henderson at AllMusic gave The Odyssey three stars out of five, calling it an "old-school" album and "dated" for its time, while clarifying that "dated isn't necessarily a bad thing—if you hold a particular era in high regard, dated can actually be a plus." He also likened the mythical and fantasy elements to classic heavy metal acts such as Queensrÿche, Yngwie Malmsteen, Ronnie James Dio, Iron Maiden and Metallica.

Loudwire named the album in fifth in the list "Top 25 Power Metal Albums of All Time" and Metal Hammer ranked it at #19 in a similar list.

Track listing

Personnel
Russell Allen – vocals
Michael Romeo – guitar, orchestral keyboard
Michael Pinnella – keyboard, piano
Jason Rullo – drums
Michael LePond – bass
Technical personnel
Michael Romeo – programming, engineering, mixing, production
Steve Evetts – mixing, production
Peter van 't Riet – mastering
Tom Thiel, Illuvision – artwork

References

External links
In Review: Symphony X "The Odyssey" at Guitar Nine Records

Symphony X albums
2002 albums
Inside Out Music albums
Works based on the Odyssey
Music based on works by Homer